Clitemnestra is a genus of sand wasps in the family Crabronidae. There are at least 60 described species in Clitemnestra.

Species
These 68 species belong to the genus Clitemnestra:

 Clitemnestra aenea (Handlirsch, 1888) i c g
 Clitemnestra aeroides R. Bohart, 2000 i c g
 Clitemnestra albitarsis R. Bohart, 2000 i c g
 Clitemnestra antennalis R. Bohart, 2000 i c g
 Clitemnestra azurea R. Bohart, 2000 i c g
 Clitemnestra bijaguae R. Bohart, 2000 i c g
 Clitemnestra bipunctata (Say, 1824) i c g b
 Clitemnestra boliviana R. Bohart, 2000 i c g
 Clitemnestra brasilica R. Bohart, 2000 i c g
 Clitemnestra caerulea R. Bohart, 2000 i c g
 Clitemnestra carinata R. Bohart, 2000 i c g
 Clitemnestra championi (Cameron, 1890) i c g
 Clitemnestra chilensis (de Saussure, 1867) i c g
 Clitemnestra chilicola R. Bohart, 2000 i c g
 Clitemnestra chrysos R. Bohart, 2000 i c g
 Clitemnestra clypearis R. Bohart, 2000 i c g
 Clitemnestra colombica R. Bohart, 2000 i c g
 Clitemnestra colorata (W. Fox, 1897) i c g
 Clitemnestra cooperi R. Bohart, 2000 i c g
 Clitemnestra costaricae R. Bohart, 2000 i c g
 Clitemnestra densa R. Bohart, 2000 i c g
 Clitemnestra duboulayi (R. Turner, 1908) i c g
 Clitemnestra ecuadorica R. Bohart, 2000 i c g
 Clitemnestra egana R. Bohart, 2000 i c g
 Clitemnestra fritzi R. Bohart, 2000 i c g
 Clitemnestra fulva R. Bohart, 2000 i c g
 Clitemnestra gayi (Spinola, 1851) i c g
 Clitemnestra gendeka (Pulawski, 1997) i c g
 Clitemnestra guttatula (R. Turner, 1936) i c g
 Clitemnestra hansoni R. Bohart, 2000 i c g
 Clitemnestra hirta (Handlirsch, 1888) i c g
 Clitemnestra irwini R. Bohart, 2000 i c g
 Clitemnestra lissa R. Bohart, 2000 i c g
 Clitemnestra lucidula (R. Turner, 1908) i c g
 Clitemnestra megalophthalma (Handlirsch, 1895) i c g
 Clitemnestra menkei (Pagliano, 1995) i c g
 Clitemnestra mimetica (Cockerell, 1915) i c g
 Clitemnestra multistrigosa Reed, 1894 i c g
 Clitemnestra nigrifrons R. Bohart, 2000 i c g
 Clitemnestra nigritula R. Bohart, 2000 i c g
 Clitemnestra nigroclypeata (Pulawski, 1997) i c g
 Clitemnestra noumeae (Ohl, 2002) i c g
 Clitemnestra novaguineensis (R. Bohart, 1970) i c g
 Clitemnestra oblita (Holmberg, 1903) i c g
 Clitemnestra obscura (Pulawski, 1997) i c g
 Clitemnestra ocellaris R. Bohart, 2000 i c g
 Clitemnestra paraguayana R. Bohart, 2000 i c g
 Clitemnestra pecki R. Bohart, 2000 i c g
 Clitemnestra pedunculata R. Bohart, 2000 i c g
 Clitemnestra perlucida (R. Turner, 1916) i c g
 Clitemnestra plomleyi (R. Turner, 1940) i c g
 Clitemnestra puyo R. Bohart, 2000 i c g
 Clitemnestra ruficrus R. Bohart, 2000 i c g
 Clitemnestra sanambrosiana (Pérez D'Angello, 1980) i g
 Clitemnestra sanguinolenta (R. Turner, 1908) i c g
 Clitemnestra schlingeri R. Bohart, 2000 i c g
 Clitemnestra sensilis R. Bohart, 2000 i c g
 Clitemnestra sphaerosoma (Handlirsch, 1895) i c g
 Clitemnestra strigula R. Bohart, 2000 i c g
 Clitemnestra tenuicornis (Rayment, 1955) i c g
 Clitemnestra thoracica (F. Smith, 1869) i c g
 Clitemnestra toroi R. Bohart, 2000 i c g
 Clitemnestra vallensis R. Bohart, 2000 i c g
 Clitemnestra vardyorum R. Bohart, 2000 i c g
 Clitemnestra violacea (Handlirsch, 1888) i c g
 Clitemnestra wasbaueri R. Bohart, 2000 i c g
 Clitemnestra willinki R. Bohart, 2000 i c g
 Clitemnestra zeta R. Bohart, 2000 i c g

Data sources: i = ITIS, c = Catalogue of Life, g = GBIF, b = Bugguide.net

References

Crabronidae
Articles created by Qbugbot